Dilce is a small settlement west of Postojna in the Inner Carniola region of Slovenia. Dilce was a hamlet of Goriče until 1994, when it was separated and made an independent settlement.

References

External links

Dilce on Geopedia

Populated places in the Municipality of Postojna